Hampden Park is a suburb of Eastbourne, in the Eastbourne district, in the county of East Sussex, England. It is notable for its unique railway station, where local trains on the East Coastway Line stop twice, and is thought to be the busiest level crossing in Europe This station, now known as Hampden Park station, was once named 'Willingdon Halt'.

Attractions
Hampden Park itself is a large pleasant space with a fair sized lake. There is a park cafe called Lakeside Cafe, a children's playground, outdoor tennis courts, playing fields and plenty of routes for joggers and strollers, as well as a large area of sports fields. The area is the home of Eastbourne Rugby Club and two bowls clubs are nearby. Its main inhabitants are the grey squirrel, and several species inhabit the lake, notably mallard ducks, Canada geese, mute swans, moorhen, herons, gulls and the rock pigeon.

In 2011 there was a large pond enhancement program carried out on the Decoy Pond. This was funded by Eastbourne Borough Council and a large grant obtained from the Big Lottery Fund by The Friends of the Hampden Park.

History
Prior to 1901 the land now called Hampden Park was part of the Ratton Estate owned by Lord Willingdon. Ratton is mentioned in the Domesday survey of 1087 and for a long time the woodland and lake had been a decoy attracting wildfowl for the estate kitchens. By the end of the 19th century the lake had probably fallen into disuse. Lord Willingdon agreed to sell  to Eastbourne Corporation on condition that a new main road, Kings Drive, was built from Eastbourne to Willingdon. Hampden Park, named after Lord Willingdon’s grandfather, Viscount Hampden, was opened by Lord Rosebery on 12 August 1902 and was the first Corporation-owned park in Eastbourne.

The parish was formed on 1 April 1911 from part of Willingdon. In 1911 the parish had a population of 988. On 1 April 1912 the parish was abolished and merged Eastbourne.

St Mary's Church is the Anglican parish church of Hampden Park.  Edward Maufe's Perpendicular Gothic Revival building of 1952–54 replaced a church of 1908 which had been destroyed by a bomb in 1940. It is a Grade II listed building.

References

Areas of Eastbourne
Former civil parishes in East Sussex